For the results of the Mauritania national football team, see:
Mauritania national football team results (1961–2019)
Mauritania national football team results (2020–present)